The 1922–23 Sheffield Shield season was the 27th season of the Sheffield Shield, the domestic first-class cricket competition of Australia. New South Wales won the championship by virtue of having a better average.

Table

Statistics

Most Runs
Bill Woodfull 514

Most Wickets
Arthur Mailey 30

References

Sheffield Shield
Sheffield Shield
Sheffield Shield seasons